Murray McLachlan (born October 20, 1948) is a Canadian retired ice hockey goaltender who played 2 games in the National Hockey League with the Toronto Maple Leafs during the 1970–71 season. McLachlan was signed as a free agent by the Maple Leafs after starring for the University of Minnesota Golden Gophers. As a youth, he played in the 1961 Quebec International Pee-Wee Hockey Tournament with Toronto Dileo.

Career statistics

Regular season and playoffs

Awards and honours

References

External links
 

1948 births
Living people
Canadian expatriate ice hockey players in the United States
Canadian ice hockey goaltenders
Ice hockey people from Ontario
Minnesota Golden Gophers men's ice hockey players
Sportspeople from London, Ontario
Toronto Maple Leafs players
Tulsa Oilers (1964–1984) players
Undrafted National Hockey League players